The 2010 FK Cup was the first edition of the FK Cup. The competition held from 13 to 15 August 2010 in Hoengseong, Gangwon. All matches were played at Songho College Gymnasium, Hoengseong.

Final table

Winners

References

FK Cup
2010 in futsal